Richard Markgraf (13 March 1869 – January or February 1916) was a German Bohemian paleontologist. He is best remembered for his expeditions to Egypt, which discovered the first known remains of many extinct fossil reptiles, such as Aegyptosaurus and Spinosaurus.

Biography
Richard Markgraf was born in Přísečnice, Austria-Hungary (now the Czech Republic) on 13 March 1869 and he became a bricklayer before joining one of the travelling Preßnitz music groups until he eventually ended up impoverished in Cairo, Egypt, working as a pianist in the Shepheard's Hotel.

He eventually met the German palaeontologist Eberhard Fraas in 1897 who hired him because of his knowledge of Arabic and he taught Markgraf the basic techniques of fossil hunting; he subsequently worked as a collector for Fraas.

Markgraf eventually met Ernst Stromer during the winter of 1901–1902 and the two got along very well. Markgraf was Stromer's Sammler, or fossil collector, for 10½ years, and became a close friend of Stromer. Markgraf, however, was often ill by this time. It is unclear whether the cause was malaria, intestinal bleeding from typhoid, or chronic amebic dysentery. It was during the expeditions with Stromer where many of his notable discoveries were made, such as Aegyptosaurus during the early 1910s, Spinosaurus in 1912 and Bahariasaurus in 1911. Because of his discoveries, he was he was awarded the Medal of Merit of the Royal Order of Württemberg in 1904 and also the Bene-Merenti Medal (in silver) from the Bavarian Academy of Sciences in 1902.

He also met another palaeontologist, Henry Fairfield Osborn, when his 1907 expedition to the Faiyum Oasis accidentally stumbled across Markgraf while he was collecting fossils for Stromer, and despite a language barrier, Markgraf began to also collect fossils for Osborn for six weeks during this 1907 expedition, which became a success after the discovery of the Jebel Qatrani Formation, which is a large Oligocene fossil deposit within the oasis.

Markgraf stopped collecting for Stromer  and after the outbreak of the First World War in 1914, Markgraf lost his main source of income because his fossil collecting was reduced on British soil (he mainly collected in Egypt), leading him to fall back into poverty again. He died from an unknown illness in 1916 aged 46; this illness was likely one of the ones that he was suffering from in 1901 when he first met Stromer.

References

1869 births
1916 deaths
Czech paleontologists
People from Chomutov District